Sayed Khwaja Aziz-ud-Din (12 July 1930 – June 1998) was an Indian footballer. He competed at the 1952 Summer Olympics and the 1956 Summer Olympics. He also captained the national team.

Personal life
Born on 12 July 1930 in Gocha Mahal, during the British Raj, Aziz studied from the infant class to the sixth form at the Government High School, Gocha Mahal. His physical instructor Thakur Rao taught him the rudiments of the game and inspired him to improve his prowess in football.

International career
Syed Khwaja Azizuddin, popularly known as Aziz, played either as full back or center half and was one of the versatile players in Indian football during the 1950s. He was a member of the India national football team that won gold medal at the inaugural 1951 Asian Games at Delhi. He later participated in 1953 Quadrangular tournament in Rangoon with Balaidas Chatterjee managed team, and won the title.

In the 1956 Summer Olympics at Melbourne, Australia, Aziz appeared with the national team that finished in fourth place, losing the bronze-medal match to Bulgaria 3–0. He was also captain of the national team, that emerged victories in the Quadrangular Tournament at Dhaka, Bangladesh, in 1955.

Aziz participated in the 1958 Asian Games in Tokyo, where they finished fourth, losing the bronze-medal match to Indonesia 4–1. The next year he traveled to Malaysia where they took part in the Merdeka Cup, and finished as the tournament runners-up.

In national team, Aziz's teammates under coach Syed Abdul Rahim were like: Ahmed Hussain, Peter Thangaraj, Nikhil Nandy, Samar Banerjee, P. K. Banerjee, Kesto Pal, Neville Stephen D'Souza, Tulsidas Balaram, Abdul Latif, Mariappa Kempiah, Chuni Goswami, Kannan, Mohammed Rahmatullah.

Club career
He began his club career with National Sporting Club. From 1949 to 1960, he played for Hyderabad state team in the Santosh Trophy. They reached the finals four times, emerging winners in 1956–57 and 1957–58 and runners-up in 1949–50 and 1950–51. On both occasions that Hyderabad won the Santosh Trophy, Aziz played as skipper.

When he joined the famed Hyderabad City Police, he came under the able guidance of the famous late Syed Abdul Rahim, who improved his techniques and tactical knowledge of the game. In 1951, he represented India for the first time during a tour of the Far East and later helped the country win the gold medal in the Asian Games at Delhi. Since then he was a regular for India till 1959, including tours to Russia, Ceylon and the Far East and test matches at home against Russia, Austria and Pakistan.

Stockily built Aziz, though not very tall, had superb technique. With a powerful kick on either foot he was known for his deft passing. He was equally adept with either foot and was commanding in the air. He was never flustered and played with a cool head. His positional sense was impeccable and understanding with his colleagues was always of a high calibre. He set up counter attacks with accurate cross-field passes to either flank. Former national team manager Syed Nayeemuddin paid the late Aziz the ultimate tribute when he said, "Aziz was like a Brazilian defender, he had such superb skills. Even the great Junior would have looked junior at times to Aziz".

Honours
Hyderabad City Police
Durand Cup: 1950–51, 1954, 1957–58, 1961; runner-up: 1952, 1956–57
Rovers Cup: 1950, 1951, 1952, 1953, 1954, 1957

India
Asian Games Gold medal: 1951
Colombo Cup: 1952, 1953, 1954, 1955
Merdeka Tournament runner-up: 1959

Hyderabad
Santosh Trophy: 1956–57, 1957–58

References

Bibliography

External links
 

1930 births
1998 deaths
Footballers from Hyderabad, India
Indian footballers
India international footballers
Olympic footballers of India
Footballers at the 1952 Summer Olympics
Footballers at the 1956 Summer Olympics
Association football defenders
Footballers at the 1951 Asian Games
Footballers at the 1954 Asian Games
Footballers at the 1958 Asian Games
Medalists at the 1951 Asian Games
Asian Games gold medalists for India
Asian Games medalists in football
Indian emigrants to the United States